Pandaemonium  is Christopher Brookmyre's thirteenth novel.  It was published in the United Kingdom on 13 August 2009.

Plot 

The senior pupils of St Peter's High School are on retreat to a secluded outdoor activity center, coming to terms with the murder of a fellow pupil through the means you would expect: counselling, contemplation, candid discussion and even prayer; not to mention booze, drugs, clandestine liaisons and as much partying as they can get away with. Not so far away, the commanders of a top-secret military experiment, long-since spiraled out of control, fear they may have literally unleashed the forces of Hell. Two very different worlds are on a collision course, and will clash in an earthly battle between science and the supernatural, philosophy and faith, civilization and savagery.

References 

2009 British novels
Novels by Christopher Brookmyre
Little, Brown and Company books